"Summer Day" is a song written and recorded by American singer-songwriter Sheryl Crow. It was released as the first single from Crow's eighth studio album, 100 Miles from Memphis. Written by Crow, Doyle Bramhall II, and Justin Stanley, the song features a breezy, smooth tempo, with a noticeable dose of 1970s R&B influence. In the music video, Crow goes to the park during a sunny day, staging an intimate set with her band.

Background
"Summer Day" is a delightfully breezy slice of glory-days AM radio pop. "I wanted to experiment with writing something simple and positive," says Crow. "The feeling of a great, solid love—not just a new love, but something everlasting."

Critical reception
The song received positive reviews from music critics. Amar Too from AOL Music said that "'Summer Day' might just be the perfect, flagship single for your summer night drives, or evenings spent in your favorite rocking chair on the patio. . . . The track is guaranteed to provide that extra dose of summertime easiness we're all looking forward to". Jonathan Keefe from Slant Magazine classified the song as "an effortlessness song that is instantly likable and effervescent".
The song was A-listed on BBC Radio 2 for the week commencing July 3.

"Summer Day" charted moderately in the United States, peaking at No. 3 on the Triple A chart and at No. 23 on the Hot AC chart, remaining in the chart for twelve non-consecutive weeks. However, the song met with success in Japan, where it peaked in the top 10.

Music video
The music video for the song was shot in Nashville, and was released on July 14, 2010 on VEVO and was directed by Wayne Isham.
Sheryl Crow commented that "[Her] friend Keith Megna made an amazing 'Summer Day' video for us – inspired by a great day in Central Park and our actual studio recording of the song."

Concept
The video captures people enjoying the summer are flashed while Crow delivers a groovy performance. Some are playing hula hoops and the others are either sitting on a bench while listening to music or canoeing in the lake nearby.

Chart performance

References

2010 singles
Sheryl Crow songs
Songs written by Sheryl Crow
Music videos directed by Wayne Isham
Songs written by Justin Stanley
2010 songs
A&M Records singles